Gavin Brown AO FAA CorrFRSE (27 February 1942 – 25 December 2010) was a Scottish-born mathematician and long-serving Vice-Chancellor and Principal of the University of Sydney between 1996 and 2008.

Early career
After attending secondary school at Madras College in St Andrews, Brown graduated with a Master of Arts degree (1st Class Honours and the Duncan Medal) from the University of St Andrews (1963), and a Doctor of Philosophy degree from the University of Newcastle upon Tyne (1966). His academic career began at the University of Liverpool, where he became a senior lecturer in mathematics.

Brown accepted the Chair of Pure Mathematics at the University of New South Wales in 1975 and he and his family emigrated to Australia. At the University of New South Wales, Brown held a number of academic administrative posts, including Head of the Department of Pure Mathematics, Head of the School of Mathematics, and Dean of the Faculty of Science. During this time, he was awarded the Sir Edmund Whittaker Memorial Prize and the Australian Mathematical Society Medal.

Later career
In 1992, Brown became the Deputy Vice-Chancellor (Research) at the University of Adelaide. Later, in 1994, he became the Vice-Chancellor. He took up the position of Vice-Chancellor and Principal of the University of Sydney in 1996 and retired from the post in 2008.

Brown was actively involved in the work of the Australian Research Council as a chairman of various funding committees from 1988 to 1993, and a member of the Council from 1992 to 1993. He wrote more than 100 research papers and served on the board of several international journals. His research areas were broad, including harmonic analysis, measure theory and algebraic geometry. He was awarded an honorary Doctor of Laws by the University of St Andrews (1997) and an honorary Doctor of Laws by the University of Dundee (2004).  In 2006, he was appointed an Officer of the Order of Australia.

Personal life
Brown returned to Adelaide after retiring in 2008. He died of a heart attack on Christmas Day in 2010.

References

External links
 Brown's bio at the University of Sydney

1942 births
2010 deaths
Alumni of the University of St Andrews
Alumni of Newcastle University
Fellows of the Australian Academy of Science
Officers of the Order of Australia
Scottish emigrants to Australia
Academics of the University of Liverpool
Vice-Chancellors of the University of Sydney
People educated at Madras College
Vice-Chancellors of the University of Adelaide
20th-century Australian mathematicians
21st-century Australian mathematicians
Sir Edmund Whittaker Memorial Prize winners